Yevgeny Petrashov (born September 4, 1974) is a Kyrgyzstani former swimmer, who specialized in breaststroke events. He is a three-time Olympian (1996, 2000, and 2004), and a former Kyrgyzstan record holder in both 100 and 200 m breaststroke.

Biography
His son is Olympic swimmer Denis Petrashov.

Petrashov made his first Kyrgyz team at the 1996 Summer Olympics in Atlanta. There, he failed to reach the top 16 final in the men's 100 m breaststroke, finishing in forty-second place with a time of 1:07.44. He also placed twenty-first, as a member of the Kyrgyzstan team, in the  medley relay (3:56.24).

On his second Olympic appearance in Sydney 2000, Petrashov fell to last place and fifty-ninth overall in heat four of the 100 m breaststroke by a 3.30-second margin behind joint winners Arsenio López of Puerto Rico and Valērijs Kalmikovs of Latvia, finishing the race at 1:07.32.

Petrashov swam for his third time in the 100 m breaststroke at the 2004 Summer Olympics in Athens. He achieved a FINA B-standard of 1:04.82 from the Kazakhstan Open Championships in Almaty. He challenged seven other swimmers in heat two, including Madagascar's Jean Luc Razakarivony, who also competed in the same number of Games. He earned a seventh spot by four hundredths of a second (0.04) behind Razakarivony in 1:07.78. Petrashov ended his third and final Olympic stint with a fifty-fifth-place effort on the first day of preliminaries.

Petrashov currently serves as the head coach of Kyrgyzstan's swimming squad.

Major Results

Individual

Relay

References

External links
 

1974 births
Living people
Kyrgyzstani male breaststroke swimmers
Olympic swimmers of Kyrgyzstan
Swimmers at the 1996 Summer Olympics
Swimmers at the 2000 Summer Olympics
Swimmers at the 2004 Summer Olympics
Sportspeople from Bishkek
Kyrgyzstani people of Russian descent
Swimmers at the 2006 Asian Games
Asian Games competitors for Kyrgyzstan